During the 2001–02 English football season, Swansea City competed in the Third Division.

Season summary
In July, the club was sold to managing director Mike Lewis for £1. Lewis subsequently sold on his stake to a consortium of Australian businessmen behind the Brisbane Lions AFL team, fronted by Tony Petty. Seven players were sacked and eight others saw their contracts terminated, angering supporters. Sanctions were threatened by the Football League, with a rival consortium headed by ex-player Mel Nurse seeking to buy out the new owners. During this period, manager John Hollins was sacked after a poor start to the season, and Colin Addison took over as manager. The turmoil led to the creation of the Swansea City Supporters' Trust, which sought to save the club and ultimately guarantee supporter representation on the club's board.

The Petty group sold its stake in January 2002 after a bitter stand-off with the Nurse consortium, which was supported by the majority of the club's fans. Jim Moore and Mel Griffin, previously rescuers of Hull City, stepped into the breach and persuaded Petty to sell to them (as he had promised to bankrupt the club & make it extinct rather than sell to Nurse). From there Moore became chairman for three weeks, giving the Nurse consortium time to organize its finances. Having successfully reorganized the finances of Hull City, both Moore and Griffin were believers in clubs belonging in the hands of local people, and so, believing Nurse's group were best for the Swans, the two sold the club to Nurse's consortium for £1.

Despite problems off the pitch, the team had managed a mid-table position, but lack of funds led to Addison's dismissal in early March, and under caretakers Nick Cusack and Roger Freestone the club slumped to a 20th placed-finish.

Kit
Swansea City's kit was manufactured by Bergoni and sponsored by The Travel House.

First-team squad
Squad at end of season

Left club during season

References

Notes

Swansea City A.F.C. seasons
Swansea City
Swansea City